The following is the list of Bolesław III Wrymouth's expeditions into the then Slavic Pagan Duchy of Pomerania during the early 12th century.

List of Polish campaigns

References

History of Pomerania